The Malmö Symphony Orchestra is a Swedish orchestra, based in Malmö. Since 2015, it has been resident at the Malmö Live Concert Hall.  The orchestra has a complement of 94 musicians.

History
The orchestra was founded in 1925 with Walther Meyer-Radon as the first chief conductor, from 1925 to 1929.  

At first, the orchestra performed both symphony concerts and served as the orchestra of the Malmö Opera and Music Theatre.  From 1991 onwards, the orchestra has been exclusively devoted to symphony orchestra concerts.  Between 1985 and 2015, the orchestra gave its main concert series in the Malmö Concert Hall, after which they moved to Malmö Live.

Herbert Blomstedt held the title of Huvuddirigent (principal conductor) during 1962–1963. Past principal guest conductors have included Brian Priestman (1988–1990), Gilbert Varga (1997–2000), and Mario Venzago (2000–2003). 

Since 2019, the orchestra's current chief conductor is Robert Treviño.  In May 2021, the orchestra announced that Treviño is to stand down as its chief conductor at the close of the 2020-2021 season, and then to take the title of artistic adviser for 2 years.

The orchestra has made recordings for BIS, Daphne and Naxos.

Chief conductors
 Walther Meyer-Radon (1925–1929)
 Georg Schnéevoigt (1930–1947)
 Sten-Åke Axelson (1948–1961)
 Rolf Agop (1962–1964)
 Peter Erős (1966–1968)
 Elyakum Shapirra (1969–1974)
 Janos Fürst (1974–1977)
 Stig Westerberg (1978–1985)
 Vernon Handley (1986–1988)
 James DePreist (1991–1994)
 Paavo Järvi (1994–1997)
 Christoph König (2003–2006)
 Vassily Sinaisky (2007–2011)
 Marc Soustrot  (2011–2019)
 Robert Treviño (2019–2021)

Selected recordings 

 Franz Schmidt: Symphonie n° 1, conductor  Vassili Sinaïski, (2009, Naxos).
 Camille Saint-Saëns : Complete 5 concertos and works for piano and orchestra, conductor Marc Soustrot, Romain Descharmes, piano (Naxos 2017)
 Camille Saint-Saëns : Concertos for cello and orchestra n° 1 & n° 2, Gabriel Schwabe, cello, conductor Marc Soustrot (CD Naxos 2017)
 Camille Saint-Saëns : Complete 5 symphonies, conductor Marc Soustrot (3 CD Naxos 2020)
Beethoven : Complète 9 symphonies, conductor Robert Treviño (5 SACD Ondine 2019)

References

External links
Malmö Symphony Orchestra homepage

Musical groups established in 1925
Swedish symphony orchestras
Tourist attractions in Malmö